Tanami is an interim Australian bioregion, comprising  in the Northern Territory and Western Australia. It is part of the Great Sandy-Tanami desert ecoregion.

The bioregion has the code TAN. There are three subregions.

See also

Geography of Australia

References

Further reading
 Thackway, R and I D Cresswell (1995) An interim biogeographic regionalisation for Australia : a framework for setting priorities in the National Reserves System Cooperative Program Version 4.0 Canberra : Australian Nature Conservation Agency, Reserve Systems Unit, 1995. 

IBRA regions
Biogeography of Western Australia
Biogeography of the Northern Territory